Arturo Riccardi (30 October 1878 – 20 December 1966) was an Italian admiral during the Second World War, serving as the Ministry of Marine Director General of Personnel from 1935 to 1940 and Under Secretary of State of the Navy from 1941 until 1943. A specialist of aerial warfare, Riccardi frequently worked with senior German naval officers on the defense of the Italian peninsula.

Early career
Born to Adolph Riccardi and Ifigenia Rasini Di Mortigliengo in Pavia, Italy, (although other sources claim Saluzzo), Riccardi entered the Italian military academy to become a successful career soldier. Seeing action with the Italian marines in the Boxer Rebellion in 1900–1901, the Far East Campaign of 1905, and the First World War, Riccardi was awarded several medals for valor. These medals included the Bronze Medal of Military Valor, China Campaign Medal (1900–1901), Gold Cross for Seniority, War Merit Cross, Medal of War (1915–1918), Unit of Italy memorial medal, inter-allied Victory Medal, among others.

Interwar years
Heading the Cabinet to the Ministry of Navy from 6 February until 13 May 1925, Riccardi was finally made an admiral on 8 September 1932. Following his admission into the La Spezia (PNF) political party in 1934, he won promotion to vice admiral on 27 December 1935.

Riccardi would go on to hold a series of positions including Chief Executive Officer Official of the Case of Navy and Member of the Permanent Commission for the lighting system and signalling of the coasts on 12 August, as well as General Manager of the Staff and the Military Services to the Ministry of Navy on 22 August 1935, before becoming Ministry of Marine Director General of Personnel.

Second World War
Riccardi's first major engagement took place at the Battle of Taranto, when British carrier-borne torpedo bombers delivered a devastating surprise attack against Italian naval targets in the harbor of Taranto on the night of 11–12 November 1940.

Succeeding Admiral Domenico Cavagnari as chief of staff of the Italian Royal Navy (Regia Marina) on 11 December 1940, Riccardi became de facto commander of the existing Ministries for wartime aviation and naval forces. Riccardi did this in addition to his position as the Department of the Navy's Undersecretary of State.

Meeting with representatives of the Nazi Germany's Kriegsmarine, Riccardi led the Italian Royal Navy delegation, along with Raffaele de Courten, Emilio Brenta, and Carlo Giartosio during the Conference of Merano, from 13 February to 14 February 1941.

Riccardi was forced to surrender both positions on 25 July 1943, following the downfall of Italian dictator Benito Mussolini's fascist regime. Under the new Pietro Badoglio administration,  Raffaele de Courten officially succeeded Riccardi as Naval Minister and, after 1945, the position came up in the new Ministry of Defense.

Honours
From the Italian Wikipedia
Commander of the Colonial Order of the Star of Italy (16 July 1936; also appointed Officer on the same date)
Grand Officer of the Order of Saints Maurice and Lazarus (28 September 1936; Commander: 15 June 1933; Officer: 1 June 1930; Knight: 6 December 1914)
Grand Cross with the Grand Cordon of the Order of the Crown of Italy (1 February 1940; Grand Officer: 27 October 1934; Commander: 12 November 1925; Officer: 14 December 1919; Knight: 14 December 1911)
Iron Cross (18 January 1943)
Bronze Medal of Military Valor (For China Campaign: 8 September 1904)
Allied Victory Medal (WWI)
Commemorative Medal of the Unity of Italy
Maurizian Medal
Italian War Cross
Gold Cross for Long Service
Commemorative Medal for the China Campaign 1900-1901
Commemorative Medal for the Italo-Austrian War 1915-1918

References
Parrish, Thomas and S. L. A. Marshall, ed. The Simon and Schuster Encyclopedia of World War II, New York: Simon and Schuster, 1978.

External links
Scheda senatore RICCARDI Arturo 
Arturo Riccardi 

1878 births
1966 deaths
Italian admirals
Italian military personnel of World War I
Regia Marina personnel of World War II
Admirals of World War II
Members of the Senate of the Kingdom of Italy
Recipients of the War Merit Cross (Italy)
Recipients of the Bronze Medal of Military Valor
Recipients of the Order of Saints Maurice and Lazarus
20th-century Italian politicians